Francisco Barcia (born 22 February 1966) is a Spanish wrestler. He competed at the 1988 Summer Olympics and the 1992 Summer Olympics.

References

1966 births
Living people
Spanish male sport wrestlers
Olympic wrestlers of Spain
Wrestlers at the 1988 Summer Olympics
Wrestlers at the 1992 Summer Olympics
People from Heusden
Sportspeople from North Brabant
20th-century Spanish people
21st-century Spanish people